A wiki (or wiki wiki) is a collaborative website.

Wiki or wiki wiki may also refer to the following:

Computing and technology
 .wiki, a generic top-level domain overseen by ICANN
 PBworks (formerly PBwiki), a commercial real-time collaborative editing (RTCE) system 
 Wiki software, software used to run a wiki website
 Wikimedia Foundation, a US non-profit charitable organization
 Wikimedia movement, or Wikimedia, the global community of contributors to Wikimedia Foundation projects
 Wikipedia, a wiki encyclopedia sometimes referred to as "wiki"
 WikiWikiWeb, the original wiki website, and originator of the word "wiki"

Places
 Wiki Peak, a mountain in Alaska, USA

People with the name
 Wiki (rapper), stage name of Patrick Morales, an American rapper
 Wiki Baker, vocalist and community worker from New Zealand
 Wiki González, Major League baseball player
 Wieke Hoogzaad (nicknamed Wiki de Viking), Dutch triathlete
 Ruben Wiki, New Zealand rugby league footballer

Arts, entertainment, and media

Fictional entities
 W1K1, pronounced "wiki", a mini-robot from the 1970s Filmation sci-fi show Jason of Star Command
 Wiki, a sidekick character in the video game Zack & Wiki: Quest for Barbaros' Treasure
 Vicky the Viking (also Wikki or Wickie), a 1970s animated cartoon character 
 Wiki Dankowska, a fictional character in the British television show Coronation Street

Music
 "Jam on Revenge (the Wikki-Wikki Song)", a 1983 single by the band Newcleus
 "Wiki wiki", a phrase meant to simulate a DJ scratching a turntable, used by Newcleus in several songs as well as Will Smith's "Wild Wild West", among others

Other uses in arts, entertainment, and media
 WIKI (FM) a country music radio station in Carrollton, Kentucky, United States
 "Wiki-wiki", a story (and title character) written by the title character of Jack London's novel Martin Eden

Other uses
 Wiki wiki dollar, a 1960s gasoline give-away promotion
 Wiki Wiki Shuttle, a Hawaiian airport bus system
 WikiLeaks, an international non-profit organisation that publishes secret information, news leaks, and classified media provided by anonymous sources

See also

List of wikis
Wick (disambiguation)
Wicked (disambiguation)
Wicket
Wicki (disambiguation)
Wicky (disambiguation)
Wookie (disambiguation)